HMS Irresistible was a 74-gun third rate ship of the line of the Royal Navy, launched on 6 December 1782 at Harwich.

Career
Irresistible captured the French privateer Quatre frères in April 1797 in the Mediterranean. The Royal Navy took her into service as HMS Transfer.

Irresistible fought at the Battle of Groix in 1795, and at the Battle of Cape St Vincent in 1797 and captured two Spanish frigates at the action of 26 April 1797.

Fate

Irresistible was broken up in 1806.

Citations and notes

References

Lavery, Brian (2003) The Ship of the Line - Volume 1: The development of the battlefleet 1650-1850. Conway Maritime Press. .

Ships of the line of the Royal Navy
Albion-class ships of the line (1763)
1782 ships
Ships built in Harwich